Edward Francis Mickolus, Jr. (born December 28, 1950) is an author and counter-terrorism expert, and formerly an officer in the Central Intelligence Agency, from which he retired in 2008.  Mickolus is the author or co-author of a number of books on counter-terrorism.

Personal life 
Born to Catherine Teresa (née Lawlor; 1916–1995) and Edward Francis Mickolus (1911–1996), he is of Irish and Lithuanian ethnic descent, and he was raised and is a practicing Catholic.

Mickolus married Susan Schjelderup, daughter of Maria (née Giuliano; 1922–2006) and John Rost Schjelderup (1917–2005),  on January 15, 1983.

He is an avid collector of neckties with around 1700 of them.

References 

1950 births
Living people
American investigative journalists
People of the Central Intelligence Agency
Georgetown University alumni
Yale University alumni
Counterterrorism theorists
Terrorism theorists
Experts on terrorism